MSTC Limited (formerly known as Metal Scrap Trade Corporation Limited) is a central public sector undertakings under the Ministry of Steel, Government of India. It is involved in diversified e-commerce services. Its corporate office is in Kolkata, West Bengal with regional branch offices in various other cities. The company reported a net profit of INR 112.95 crore for fiscal year 2020-21. Incorporated on 9 September 1964, MSTC has 344 employees (as on 31 March 2020).

MSTC renders service to various e-commerce sectors, including e-auction, e-procurement, high sea sales, e-sales, and retail software. MSTC had developed software to conduct online draw for new LPG distribution ship scheme which was conducted by state run oil marketing psu's all over India. MSTC as of 2018 was also in the process of developing an online portal for divestment of state-owned entities through an English auction system.

The PSU has its head office in Kolkata, West Bengal; four regional offices in Kolkata, Delhi, Mumbai and Chennai; and branch offices in Chandigarh, Jaipur, Vadodara, Bhopal, Bhubaneswar, Guwahati, Bangalore, Lucknow, Ranchi, Raipur, Vizag, Trivandrum, Hyderabad, Patna and Dehradun. FSNL (Ferro Scrap Nigam Limited) is a subsidiary of MSTC.

History 
 1964 - Incorporated as a regulatory body for export of scrap.
 1982 - Independent company under Ministry of Steel.
 2002 - Awarded Miniratna Category-II status.
 2004 - Started auctioning of coal.
 2005 - Awarded Miniratna Category-I status.
 2007 - Started e-auction of manganese ore.
 2011 - Started e-auction of iron ore in Karnataka, and human hair.
 2012 - Started e-auction of chrome ore, baryte, raw pet coke.
 2013 - Started e-auction of forest produces.
 2014 - Started e-auction of iron ore in Goa and red sanders wood in Andhra Pradesh.
 2015 - E-auction of coal mine blocks and regassified LNG.
 2016 - Developed e-bidding platform under DDUGJY & IPDS, DEEP and allocation of marginal oil field.
 2017 - Developed ERAKAM portal to provide e-auction platform to sell agriculture produce.
 2018 - Developed Online LPG Distributorship Draw Software for Oil Marketing Companies.

Presence in India 
MSTC is headquartered in New Town, Kolkata.

MSTC have offices at 21 locations across India.  There are four regional offices, 13 branch offices and 1 site office Patna (Bihar).
 Regional Offices: ERO at Kolkata, WRO at Mumbai, SRO at Chennai and NRO at New Delhi.
 Branch offices: Ranchi, Guwahati, Bhubaneswar, Lucknow, Chandigarh, Bhopal, Raipur, Jaipur, Vadodara, Bangalore, Trivandrum, Vizag and Hyderabad. 
 Site offices: Patna (Bihar)

Ownership 
The company is under the administrative control of Ministry of Steel, Govt. of India. Currently 64.75% share of the company is held by Govt. of India.

CERO 
CERO is a joint venture of MSTC Ltd. and Mahindra Accelo. This Joint Venture company has set up the first auto shredding plant in India for recycling end of life vehicles and other white goods by converting these into shredded scrap which is a vital raw material of secondary steel plants, located in Greater Noida.

Awards 
 Kolkata Best Employer Brand Awards 2017 by Employer Branding Institute, India

References

External links 
 MSTC
 FSNL
 DDUGJY
 DEEP
 CERO
 ERAKAM

Government-owned companies of India
Indian companies established in 1964
1964 establishments in West Bengal
Companies based in Kolkata
Companies listed on the National Stock Exchange of India
Companies listed on the Bombay Stock Exchange